Antakalnis Cemetery, sometimes referred as Antakalnis Military Cemetery, is an active cemetery in the Antakalnis district of Vilnius, Lithuania. It was established in 1809.

Soldier burials
12 of the 14 victims of the Soviet attacks during the January Events of 1991 as well as the Medininkai Massacre are buried here. Other graves include those of Polish soldiers who perished in 1919–1920; a memorial of Lithuanian as well as German and Russian soldiers fallen in World War I; and Red Army soldiers of World War II (constructed in 1951, rebuilt 1976–1984). The monument to Soviet soldiers was taken apart and transported to storage in December 2022 due to the Russian invasion of Ukraine.

In 2003, more than 3,000 French and other soldiers of the Grande Armée of Napoleon I who took part in the 1812 invasion of Russia were reburied at the cemetery, after their bodies were excavated some two years prior from French-dug trenches which were used by the victorious Russians as mass graves due to the frozen state of the ground; French and Lithuanian diplomats participated in the interment ceremony. The remains of 18 more soldiers from the army who were dumped into a different area were reburied in November 2010.

Famous interments

The famous people buried in the Antakalnis Cemetery include:

 Algirdas Brazauskas (1932–2010), politician, first president of independent Lithuania, elected in 1993
 Teodor Bujnicki (1907–1944), Polish poet
 Vytautas Edmundas Čekanauskas (1930–2010), Lithuanian architect
 Ričardas Gavelis (1950–2002), Lithuanian writer, playwright, and journalist
 Sigitas Geda (1943–2008), Lithuanian poet, writer, playwright
 Romualdas Granauskas (1939–2014), Lithuanian writer, playwright
 Jurga Ivanauskaitė (1961–2007), Lithuanian writer
 Juozas Kamarauskas (1874–1946), Lithuanian painter
 Vytautas Kasiulis (1918–1995), Lithuanian painter of the School of Paris
 Vytautas Kernagis (1951–2008), Lithuanian singer and songwriter
 Kostas Kubilinskas (1923–1962), Lithuanian poet
 Jurgis Kunčinas (1947–2002), Lithuanian poet, writer
 Faustas Latėnas (1956–2020), Lithuanian composer, theatre manager
 Justinas Marcinkevičius (1930–2011), poet, writer and playwright
 Danas Pozniakas (1939–2005), Lithuanian boxer, the first Olympic champion from Lithuania
 Vytautas Šapranauskas (1958–2013), theater and film actor, television presenter, humorist
 Anton Schmid (1900–1942), German sergeant, Righteous Among the Nations
 Ieva Simonaitytė (1897–1978), Lithuanian writer
 Laurynas Stankevičius (1935–2017), Lithuanian politician, Prime Minister of Lithuania
 Antanas Venclova (1906–1979), Lithuanian and Soviet writer and politician
 Norbertas Vėlius (1938–1996), Lithuanian folklorist
 Rokas Žilinskas (1972–2017), Lithuanian journalist and politician
 Marian Zdziechowski (1861–1938), Polish philosopher and historian

See also
Rasos Cemetery
Bernardine Cemetery (Vilnius)
List of cemeteries in Lithuania

References

External links
 

Military cemeteries
Cemeteries in Vilnius
 
Cemeteries established in the 1800s
1809 establishments in the Russian Empire